Dawson High School is a public high school located in unincorporated Welch, Texas (USA) and classified as a 1A school by the University Interscholastic League. It is part of the Dawson Independent School District that covers the northwest portion of Dawson County. In 2013, the school was rated "Met Standard" by the Texas Education Agency.

Athletics
The Dawson Dragons compete in the following sports:
Basketball
Cheerleading
Cross country
6-man football
Golf
Tennis
Track and field

See also
List of Six-man football stadiums in Texas

References

External links
Dawson ISD

Schools in Dawson County, Texas
Public high schools in Texas